Moon Hut is the debut studio album by American singer-songwriter Kim Fox, released in 1997 by DreamWorks Records. It spawned two singles: "I Wanna Be a Witch", and "Sweetest Revenge".

Music
The song "Jen" was written about a longtime friend of Fox, who said, "Jen, who hates being called Jen (which I do in the song for artistic license), has been a friend of mine since we were three. She is a very sensual, sexual person. She’s an artist and a sculptor and a puppeteer. I wrote this song about her at a time when I was feeling really repressed. I looked at her as being someone who was free with her body and free in expression. At that time, I felt like I wasn't, so it was inspiring for me to break free and learn from her. A lot of people do take it as being either that I’m singing about a woman that I’m very attracted to or that it has more sexual connotations, which is perfectly fine. Why can’t I admire another woman for being sensual and beautiful?".

Release and promotion
It was originally scheduled to be released by DreamWorks on July 15, 1997, although it would end up being released on September 9, 1997. Fox supported the album by opening for Ben Folds Five in late 1997.

Reception

Moon Hut received 4 stars out of 5 from AllMusic's Tom Schulte, who wrote that "Potent lyrics and the bright decoration of glockenspiel, concertina and more makes Moon Hut an unforgettable album." Stereo Review gave the album 3 stars out of 5, and Houston Presss Hobart Rowland gave it 4 out of 5 stars, describing it as "one of the most satisfying debuts of the year". The New York Daily News Jim Farber named the album one of the overlooked CDs of 1997, writing that "If Fox lacks the bite of Sobule, or the smarts of Rigby, she bests them all in sheer vulnerability. Her self-deprecation couldn't seem more sweet." Robert Christgau, however, was less favorable, giving the album a "neither" rating, indicating that, according to him, it "may impress once or twice with consistent craft or an arresting track or two. Then it won't."

Monica Kendrick of the Chicago Reader gave the album a negative review in October 1997, writing "[it] finds her posing as a whip-smart Morissette-ette and sounding like a second-rate sex kitten. She’s breathy and squeaky as a cracked piccolo, and the unbelievably cloying string-and-piano arrangements must be to hedge her bets with the adult-contemporary crowd. I cannot begin to describe how awful this record is; if the fact that she’s sampled Ituri forest Pygmies for her baby-voiced cover of Springsteen’s “Atlantic City” doesn’t convince you, I am powerless."

Track listing

References

1997 debut albums
DreamWorks Records albums